Louis John "Duke" Abbruzzi (April 3, 1917 – December 6, 1982) was an American football player.  He spent one season with the Boston Yanks of the National Football League (NFL) as a special teams player and tailback.  He accounted for 229 all-purpose yards, 26 rushing yards from 6 carries, 55 receiving yards on 2 receptions, 147 yards on 8 kick off returns and completed one pass for 11 yards.

References

1917 births
1982 deaths
American football defensive backs
American football halfbacks
Boston Yanks players
Rhode Island Rams football players
People from Warren, Rhode Island
Players of American football from Rhode Island